William John Corbet (born 14 August 1881) was a Guernsey born pilot and World War II hero.

Birth

Born in Vale, Guernsey, Channel Islands, William Corbet was a member of the notable Corbet family of the Channel Islands.

World War I

Corbet served in World War I with the 2nd Royal Engineers in Wearside, Newcastle. His soldier number was 133579. He was honourably discharged in 1921.

World War II Great Escape

Corbet was living back in Vale, Guernsey, Channel Islands when on 28 June 1940 the Germans invaded Guernsey and subsequently occupied the Channel Islands. Corbet was working as a Sea Pilot and Fisherman at the time. Within 3 years living conditions in Guernsey became almost unbearable and with his wife who was ill at the time and in need of medical assistance he decided to escape the island. He snuck minuscule amounts of gas fuel over a period of approximately one years accumulating enough to fill his vessel engine without the Germans noticing.

On Saturday 14 August 1943 at approximately 3:30PM William Corbet set off from the Parish of St. Sampson's in his privately owned fishing vessel which measured 18 feet in length. He sailed near the rocky coastline harbour retrieving six other Guernsey residents where he arranged for them to board his vessel. In total 7 people boarded Corbet's boat "Kate". The other residents of the island were: Gertrude Corbet, Grace Le Morellec (Corbet's mother-in-law), Jack Hubert, Alfred Bougourd, and Mr. and Mrs Herbert Le Page.

Corbet sailed quietly under the bright light of the moon drifting aimlessly after his engine broke down. The English Channel was eerily calm that night. In one instance the vessel passed dangerously by several German E-Boats and operation search lights but luckily Corbet and passengers were not seen; everyone hiding under blackened tarpaulins.

Within 24 hours Corbet's vessel boat was spotted by a Royal Naval minesweeper who quickly identified the occupants as allies and safely brought the small vessel to the port of Dartmouth, England. Corbet was questioned by Royal Navy as were the six other escapees. Vital information from Corbet was supplied to the Royal Air Force about the poor living conditions under German occupation in Guernsey citing hunger, health issues and torture. This information proved vital to the Red Cross which helped in sending more humanitarian care to the island.

Corbet credited his engineering abilities during World War I and his piloting skills in devising and safely reaching England. The British Admiralty offered an Honourable Commission to William Corbet but due to his wife's illness and advanced age he gratefully declined it.

Results

Once the German Forces found out about Corbet's escape a number of actions took place. The home and land of the escapees were confiscated and family arrested for questioning. Tighter rules were employed as to fishing licenses and curfews strictly enforced.

Final years and death

Corbet lived out his final years in England rarely discussing his escape. No credit was given by the States of Guernsey to Corbet for the information he provided to the British Forces which aided in assisting the island in receiving better care and conditions.

William John Corbet died having changed the spelling of his surname from the use of one 't' to two (Corbett).

References

1881 births
1933 deaths
Guernsey people
World War I pilots